"Cruel to Be Kind" is a song by Nick Lowe, co-written by Lowe and his former Brinsley Schwarz bandmate Ian Gomm. Written by Lowe and Gomm while the pair were in Brinsley Schwarz, the song was saved on a demo until Columbia Records convinced Lowe to release it. Musically, the song was inspired by "The Love I Lost" by Harold Melvin & the Blue Notes, an influence reflected in more recent performances of the song.

Released as a single in 1979, the song peaked at number 12 in Australia, Canada, the UK and US charts. In the US, where it is one of Lowe's most well-known works, it remains his only single to hit the top 40, whereas in the UK "I Love the Sound of Breaking Glass" remains his biggest hit having reached number 7 a year earlier. The song was accompanied by a music video featuring Lowe's marriage to Carlene Carter.

Background
"Cruel to Be Kind" was originally written by Nick Lowe and Ian Gomm while in Brinsley Schwarz, having been recorded as a demo during this period. Lowe stated, "I wrote that when I was with a band, Brinsley Schwarz, that I was with from the early '70s to about the mid-'70s. ... We recorded it on a demo, it never came out, and when I signed to Columbia Records the A&R man [Gregg Geller] there at the time suggested I record it again. And I didn't think it would do anything, but he kind of bullied me into it." Lowe recorded the song with his band Rockpile; he recalled, "I said, 'Boys, I'm sorry, I've got this song which I've been told we've got to record, and it goes like this.' They grumbled a bit about it."

Musically, the song was originally closer to a soul style. Lowe later said, “Initially... the inspiration was a song I loved by Harold Melvin & the Blue Notes called, 'The Love I Lost', and the bass line was the same... we loved that Philly disco stuff from the 70's, The O'Jays, all that stuff, we loved that... I can't really remember much about recording it. It was just another tune that we did, you know, and I sent it over to New York to Gregg and said, Uhh, will this do? In more recent live versions, Lowe has performed the song closer to "The Love I Lost"; he explained, "How I do it now sounds quite different. In fact, it was on the radio the other day and I was quite amazed how differently I do it now".

"Cruel to Be Kind" proved to be Lowe's most successful American single. Lowe reflected on this, "When I had my couple of hits, I sort of felt like I was ticking a box more than, 'Great, I'm off now on a chart-topping career.' I felt that in order to do what I wanted to do, I had to do certain things, and one of them was to have a hit in my own right. At least one. I managed two or three, if you take in Europe. But in the United States, where it really matters, I had one hit and people still remember it, and it's a pretty good little song, you know?" Lowe continues to perform the song live and still looks favorably upon the song, saying, "I really love it. It cheers people up. ... If they're good songs, they really will stand the test of time".

Release history
The song was originally written and recorded for the final Brinsley Schwarz album, It’s All Over Now, which was never officially released.

This version was eventually issued as the non-album B-side of Lowe's "Little Hitler" single, culled from his first solo album in 1978, Jesus of Cool (retitled Pure Pop for Now People in the US). This is now known as the "original version," as compiled on Lowe's 1999 box set The Doings: The Solo Years and the 2008 expanded reissue of Jesus of Cool, as well as a bootleg entitled It's All Over Now, based on the unreleased album of the same title.

The song was then re-recorded with Rockpile and appeared on Lowe's second album Labour of Lust in 1979. It was released as a single on the Radar Records label in the UK and Columbia Records in the United States, charting at number 12 in both countries. The cover art was done by Antoinette Laumer Sales, while the cover photograph of Nick Lowe was by Greg Irvine.

The single was backed with the non-album Lowe solo song "Endless Grey Ribbon," which Lowe had originally composed for fellow Rockpile member Dave Edmunds, as referred to in the ITV documentary Born Fighters. Lowe included the Labour of Lust version of the song on both the 1984 12" single of "Half a Boy and Half a Man," from his album Nick Lowe and his Cowboy Outfit, as well as the EP version of his single "All Men Are Liars," from 1990's Party of One. It also appears on the 2010 "soundtrack" album "inspired" by the 2006 motion picture The Ant Bully. Live versions of the song appear on Lowe's 1998 EP "You Inspire Me," from his Dig My Mood album, and on the 2004 live album Untouched Takeaway.

The Labour of Lust version of "Cruel to Be Kind" has been included on many compilations of Nick Lowe's work, including 1985's 16 All Time Lowes, 1990's Basher: The Best of Nick Lowe, 1999's The Doings: The Solo Years, 2002's Anthology and 2009's Quiet Please... The New Best of Nick Lowe. It has also been included on many various artists compilations of hits of the 70s, such as Poptopia! 70's Power Pop Classics.

Music video
The video for "Cruel to be Kind" was the 67th video to air on MTV and is a combination of actual footage of Lowe's wedding to Carlene Carter, as well as a humorous re-enactment of the wedding, featuring Carter as herself, Dave Edmunds as their limo driver, Terry Williams as the photographer, Billy Bremner as the baker, and Jake Riviera (Nick's manager at the time) as the best man. The wedding took place on August 18, 1979, at the Tropicana Motel in West Hollywood. All family stayed there for the wedding and reception (also featured in the video). Filming for the video took so long that Lowe was actually late to the wedding.

Chart performance

Weekly charts

Year-end charts

Covers
The track has been covered by many artists, notably including co-writer Ian Gomm, first on his own 1997 album Crazy for You, then again in 2005 for the various artists tribute album Lowe Profile: A Tribute to Nick Lowe.  Japanese- and Greek-language versions have been released by various artists, as well as both instrumental versions and dance remixes.

In 1999, the alternative rock band Letters to Cleo performed the song for the film 10 Things I Hate About You.

A Wilco iTunes-only release in January 2012 features Lowe on vocals with the band backing (they were touring together at the time).  The original recording was played during the end credits for the documentary I.O.U.S.A..

Freedy Johnston often performs the song in concert, accompanied by solo ukulele.

The Lowe/Gomm composition should not be confused with the song "You've Got to Be Cruel to Be Kind" which was a non-charting UK single for Unit 4 + 2 in December 1965, nor for the song "Cruel To Be Kind" by Spacehog, released in 1996.  No doubt all of these songs owe their inspiration, directly or indirectly, to Shakespeare's Hamlet (Act III, scene 4), in which Hamlet tells his mother, "I must be cruel only to be kind."

Shonen Knife included a cover on Alive! In Osaka.

See also
 List of 1970s one-hit wonders in the United States

References

External links
 Music video of the song on YouTube

1978 songs
1979 singles
Songs written by Nick Lowe
Nick Lowe songs
Song recordings produced by Nick Lowe
Stiff Records singles
Radar Records singles
Columbia Records singles